Panicka Nadar Kudiyiruppu is a sub village in Nalumavadi, Thoothukudi district, Tamil Nadu, India.

References

Villages in Thoothukudi district